Stockport is a large town in Greater Manchester, England.

Stockport may also refer to:

Stockport, United Kingdom

Districts
Current
Metropolitan Borough of Stockport
Stockport Metropolitan Borough Council
Stockport (UK Parliament constituency)
Previous
County Borough of Stockport (1889-1974)
Stockport Rural District (1894-1904)
Stockport North (UK Parliament constituency) (1950-1983)
Stockport South (UK Parliament constituency) (1950-1983)

Sports
Stockport County F.C., Association Football Club
Stockport Cricket Club
Stockport Georgians A.F.C.
Stockport R.U.F.C

Other uses
The Stockport air disaster
Stockport Branch Canal
Stockport Castle
Stockport College
Stockport Express, the local newspaper
Stockport Grammar School
Stockport Peel Centre, a shopping centre
Stockport railway station
Stockport Town Hall
Stockport Viaduct
Stockport, a 1983 traditional pop song by Frankie Vaughan

Other places

In Australia
Stockport, South Australia

In Canada
Stockport Islands, Nunavut

In the United States
Stockport, Indiana
Stockport, Iowa
Stockport, New York
Stockport Creek, in New York
Stockport, Ohio